Mikhail Khristoforovich Chailakhyan (1902–1991) was an Armenian-Soviet scientist who is widely known for proposing the existence of a universal plant hormone that is involved in flowering. He named this hormone florigen in 1936. His studies included the mechanisms of flowering, tuberization and sex expression in plants. His pioneer work included the agricultural applications of phytohormones and synthetic analogs.

References 

1902 births
1991 deaths
Full Members of the USSR Academy of Sciences
Members of the German Academy of Sciences Leopoldina
Yerevan State University alumni
Academic staff of Yerevan State University
Soviet Armenians
Armenian biologists
Armenian botanists
Soviet biologists
Soviet botanists
Plant physiologists
Recipients of the Order of Lenin
Recipients of the Order of the Red Banner of Labour
Recipients of the Order of the Red Star